Reto Müller (born 5 February 1998) is a Swiss cyclist, who currently rides for UCI Continental team . His older brother Patrick Müller also competed professionally as a cyclist.

Major results

Road

2015
 3rd Road race, National Junior Championships
 4th Road race, UCI World Junior Championships
2016
 1st  Overall Grand Prix Rüebliland
 3rd  Road race, UCI World Junior Championships
 7th Road race, UEC European Junior Championships
 10th Trofeo Emilio Paganessi
2017
 3rd Time trial, National Under-23 Championships

Track

2013
 1st  Team sprint, National Championships
2014
 1st  Team sprint, National Championships
2015
 1st  Team sprint, National Championships
 2nd  Team pursuit, UCI World Junior Championships
2016
 1st  Madison (with Marc Hirschi), UCI World Junior Championships
 National Championships
1st  Madison (with Marc Hirschi)
1st  Team sprint
2017
 1st  Team pursuit, National Championships

References

External links

1998 births
Living people
Swiss male cyclists
People from Schaffhausen
Sportspeople from the canton of Schaffhausen
Swiss track cyclists